United Nations Security Council Resolution 139 was adopted unanimously on June 28, 1960. After examining the application of the Federation of Mali for membership in the United Nations, the Council recommended to the General Assembly that the Federation of Mali be admitted.

After the Federation collapsed on August 20, 1960, both Senegal and Mali were admitted as Members of the United Nations under resolutions 158 and  159 respectively.

See also
List of United Nations Security Council Resolutions 101 to 200 (1953–1965)

References
Text of the Resolution at undocs.org

External links
 

 0139
 0139
 0139
 0139
1960 in Mali
1960 in Senegal
June 1960 events